Jaylon Hadden (born April 9, 1998) is a Costa Rican professional footballer who plays for Deportivo Saprissa in the Liga FPD.

He made his debut for the Costa Rica national team on October 12 , 2018 against Mexico at. the Estadio León.

References

Living people
1998 births
Costa Rica international footballers
Association football midfielders
Costa Rican footballers
Deportivo Saprissa players